Rohrbach is a municipality in the district of Pfaffenhofen in Bavaria in Germany.

Personalities 

 Johann Andreas Schmeller (1785-1852), Germanist and linguist; spent the childhood and youth in Rinnberg near Rohrbach.
 Raymond Wilson (born 1928), physicist, honorary citizen of Rohrbach
 Roman Inderst (born 1970), economist

See also
Rohr, Pfaffenhofen

References

External links 
 

Pfaffenhofen (district)